Penicillium simplicissimum is an anamorph species of fungus in the genus Penicillium which can
promote plant growth. This species occurs on food and its primary habitat is in decaying vegetations
Penicillium simplicissimum produces verruculogene, fumitremorgene B, penicillic acid, viridicatumtoxin, decarestrictine G, decarestrictine L, decarestrictine H, decarestrictine I, decarestrictine K  decarestrictine M, dihydrovermistatin, vermistatin and penisimplicissin

Further reading

References 

simplicissimum
Fungi described in 1930
Taxa named by Charles Thom